The 1919 Akron football team represented the University of Akron in the 1919 college football season. The team was led by fifth-year head coach Fred Sefton. Akron outscored their opponents by a total of 139–38.

The season was the program's most successful one since the 7–2 1910 season, when they were known as Buchtel College.

Schedule

References

Akron
Akron Zips football seasons
Akron football